Ninne Premistha is a 2000 Indian Telugu-language romance film, produced by R. B. Choudary on the Super Good Films banner, directed by R. R. Shinde. It stars  Nagarjuna, Srikanth, Soundarya, and Rajendra Prasad. The music was composed by S. A. Rajkumar, dialogues were written by Trivikram Srinivas and cinematography was by Shyam K Naidu. It is a remake of the 1999 Tamil film Nee Varuvai Ena. The film was a box office hit.

Plot
Kalyan (Srikanth) spends his time dreaming of getting married. On a bus ride to Pattiseema (West Godavari District) to take up a promotion as a bank manager, he is involved in an accident and loses his eyesight.

Three months later, he recovers and goes back to Pattiseema with his friend Ramesh (Rajendra Prasad). Meghamala (Soundarya), living in the house opposite his, showers affection on him. He thinks she loves him and wants her to marry. When Kalyan and his parents goes to Mehamala's house to talk about marriage, she rejects him, revealing the real reason behind her attachment to Kalyan is because of his eyes. She tells him of her ill-fated love affair with Srinivas (Nagarjuna) who died in the same accident and his eyes were transplanted to Kalyan. Eager to get Kalyan married, Meghamala sends a letter to Kalyan's parents on his name, accepting the marriage proposal of Srilakshmi (Ravali) which they have picked for him. Kalyan returns home to find arrangements for his wedding in full swing. Meghamala also arrives to attend the wedding but Kalyan's parents send her away. The next day she sees Kalyan in the opposite house knowing that he had canceled the wedding and Ramesh has married Srilakshmi. The movie ends with Meghamala caring for Kalyan's eyes and he waiting for her love.

Cast

 Nagarjuna Akkineni as Srinivas
 Srikanth as Kalyan
 Soundarya as Meghamala
 Rajendra Prasad as Ramesh
 K. Chakravarthy as Bullabai
 Chandra Mohan as Shankar Rao
 Brahmanandam
 Ali as Servant
 MS Narayana as Dattudu
 Tanikella Bharani as Bank manager
 Nutan Prasad as Village head
 Chalapathi Rao as Srihari Rao
 Sivaji Raja as Nukalu 
 LB Sriram as Bullitata
 Ananth Babu as Mallasi Veerandranath
 Kallu Chidambaram as Budabukhalavadu
 Gadiraju Subba Rao as Washerman
 Mukku Raju
 Jenny as School master
 Ravali as Srilakshmi
 Annapurna as Srinivas's mother
 Sangeetha as Kalyan's mother
 Vinniradai Nirmala as Meghamala's mother
 Master Tanish
 Baby Saharik

Soundtrack

The music was composed by S. A. Rajkumar. Except for "Prema Endukani", all other songs were retained from the original. The music was released by Aditya Music.

References

External links
 

Telugu remakes of Tamil films
2000s Telugu-language films
Super Good Films films